An Afternoon in the Garden is a live musical album recorded by American singer and musician Elvis Presley at Madison Square Garden on June 10, 1972. The album was released by RCA Records on the 25th anniversary of the concert in 1997 and on March 8, 2018 received an RIAA Gold Record certification for 500,000 copies sold.

Content 
During the weekend of June 9 through June 11, 1972, Elvis Presley gave his very first concerts in New York City; he had performed on television in the 1950s and recorded at studios in the city, but had never performed in a concert venue before a paying audience. Four shows in total were scheduled: three for the evenings of Friday, Saturday, and Sunday, with a matinee performance on Saturday afternoon as well. Engineers from RCA Records taped the two Saturday concerts, the results of the evening show released a mere eight days later on Elvis: As Recorded at Madison Square Garden, while the tapes for the afternoon show stayed in the vaults until a few months before the twenty-fifth anniversary of the concerts.

The track "I Can't Stop Loving You" had been released previously in 1977 as the sole unissued track on Welcome to My World, and the tracks "Reconsider Baby" and "I'll Remember You" had been previously released on disc five of the seventies box set.

Track listing

Personnel 
 Elvis Presley – vocal, guitar
 James Burton – lead guitar
 John Wilkinson – rhythm guitar
 Charlie Hodge – guitar, backing vocals, water, scarves
 Glen Hardin – piano
 Jerry Scheff – bass
 Ronnie Tutt – drums
 J.D. Sumner & The Stamps Quartet (Ed Enoch, Bill Baize, Richard Sterban, Donnie Sumner) – backing vocals
 Kathy Westmoreland – backing vocals
 The Sweet Inspirations (Estelle Brown, Sylvia Shemwell, Myrna Smith) – backing vocals
 Joe Guercio – conductor
 The Joe Malin Orchestra

Charts

Album

Certifications and sales

References

External links 
 
 Elvis at Madison Square Garden

Live albums published posthumously
1997 live albums
Elvis Presley live albums
RCA Records live albums
Albums recorded at Madison Square Garden